Saidu Teaching Hospital, abbreviated as STH),  is located in Swat, Khyber-Pakhtunkhwa, Pakistan. 

The institution consists of two wings which are 1.5 km apart from each other. The institution has 500 beds. The catchment area is Malakand Division and parts of Kohistan District.

Accredited hospital
This hospital is accredited by the College of Physicians and Surgeons of Pakistan (CPSP) and Pakistan Medical & Dental Council (PMDC).

See also
 Khyber Teaching Hospital
 Ayub Teaching Hospital

References

Hospitals in Khyber Pakthunkhwa
Hospital buildings completed in 1971
Teaching hospitals in Pakistan
Hospitals established in 1971
Swat District